The Tenth Power is the third  book in the Chanters of Tremaris trilogy by Kate Constable.

Plot summary
On a winter night in Antaris, Tamen, the Guardian of the Wall, and other priestesses approach the ice Wall that surrounds Antaris. A priestess drugs herself, whereupon the other priestesses sing a hole into the wall. The drugged priestess is sealed inside.

Characters Calwyn, Mica, and Trout are traveling to Antaris, Calwyn's home, hoping that the priestesses may restore Calwyn's lost powers of chantment, by which she was able to manipulate wind, ice, animals, and living systems. Upon reaching the Wall, Mica uses the Clarion of the Flame, a magical object used to invoke fire, to burn a hole into the Wall. The drugged priestess is revealed, whereupon Calwyn tries to heal her, but does not succeed. The three notice other corpses encased in the Wall, which Calwyn attributes to a failure to entomb them according to custom. The three proceed to the priestesses' Dwellings.

When reaching the Dwellings, Calwyn enters the kitchen where she sees a now crippled Lia, a revered priestess and milk healer. Lia warns Calwyn that Tamen will hunt Calwyn down and seal her into the Wall with the other priestesses; having contracted an ailment called snow-sickness, they were put into the Wall in hopes of appeasing their goddess Taris, who would presumably restore spring. Marna, the High Priestess, has died and Tamen has been promoted to High Priestess in her place.

Tamen then appears and accuses Calwyn of bringing the cruel intruder Samis, the endless winter, and the snow-sickness to their homeland. Calwyn argues that she has the right to return home. Tamen sings ice onto Trouts face, whereupon Mica uses the Clarion to melt the ice and attack Tamen. This sets the kitchen on fire.

The three flee and are rescued by Ursca, the infirmarian, who takes them to an abandoned, lightning-struck barn where in the rafters is a snow-sick Marna, apparently alive. It is revealed that when Marna contracted snow-sickness, Ursca proclaimed that Marna had already died and hid her in the barn to prevent Marna from being sealed into the wall. Ursca leaves the three, whereafter Calwyn reprimands Mica for using the Clarion as a weapon. This quarrel upsets both girls.

Calwyn sleeps; later, she awakens to find Marna speaking with great difficulty. Calwyn tries to calm her; Marna tells Calwyn that the world is broken but can be mended. She speaks of the Wheel, which is an object of power, and of the mysterious Tenth Power (of chantment, which is used through specific songs) before she falls asleep. Gilly, a priestess who was formerly frivolous but has become wiser, comes in the morning to help Marna and there befriends Mica.

At night, Calwyn sneaks out to visit Lia, who reveals that she believes that Calwyn will put an end to the snow-sickness. It is also revealed that Marna holds the same opinion.

While Calwyn, Mica, and Trout travel to Antaris, Darrow, Tonno, and Halaasa travel to Gellan, where they encounter the ex-princess Keela. Darrow, while investigating an enclosure of sick chanters, contracts the snow-sickness himself. Later he and the others, including Keela, rendezvous with Calwyn, who has left Antaris and is in search of a missing piece of the Wheel. During the further travels of the combined party, Keela secretly relays information to her half-brother Samis, who is a sorcerer bent on achieving power over others.

Subsequently, the travelers enter the Veiled Lands, which are a region unknown to Calwyn's people but legendary among Halasaa's. Their journey continues underground, culminating at the mysterious Knot of Waters, where Calwyn embraces her own death to save Keela from drowning. This sacrifice revives Calwyn, restores her powers of chantment, and creates a sibling-like bond between the two women. The Clarion of the Flame is lost in the Knot and never again used.

The travelers are met by some of Halaasa's people, who teach them the true history of their world, wherein it is revealed that the snow-sickness is part of a larger pattern of entropy taking place all over Tremaris. Whereas originally all the songs of chantment overlapped, each one strengthening the others, a war between the Tree People and the Voiced Ones (see below) caused the peoples who used them, and therefore the chantments themselves, to separate. It is suggested that the abuse of chantments, practiced during the war, caused chantment to fall into disfavor everywhere. The connections between songs, people, lands, etc. became weaker and more lost.

After this meeting, Calwyn is captured by Samis, who desires to heal Tremaris so that it will not be destroyed before he can conquer it. He keeps her a prisoner in the long-abandoned city-spacecraft called Spareth, which is the means by which the Voiced Ones (colonists from another planet, presumably Earth) arrived on Tremaris millennia before the story begins, trains her in advanced uses of chantment surpassing her previous abilities, and additionally reveals to her the Tenth Power mentioned by Marna. This is the Power of Signs, a code by which the songs of chantment may be written and learned. A minor romance occurs between the two of them during this time, culminating and terminating when Samis and Calwyn use their chantments to empower Spareth, sending it into interplanetary space. Calwyn, now revealed as the legendary Singer of All Songs, remains on Tremaris, while Samis flies inside Spareth, intent on reaching its port of origin.

Ultimately, Calwyn must unite Tree People and Voiced Ones in a common need. In this she succeeds. All the people who had contracted snow-sickness, including Darrow, are healed. The peoples are united in harmony, and a new, better world begins.

Characters
Calwyn the 18-year-old protagonist; a priestess of Antaris. Once an incredibly talented chanter capable of singing nearly all of the chantments, she has lost her abilities as well as her confidence, though not her compassion, later she regains her Chantments when she was empowered with water infused with the power of Becoming. Calwyn uses her other abilities to save Tremaris, the world of which the region of Antaris is part, and by chance is granted her chantment anew. Calwyn learns that she is both a Voiced One and a Tree Person. She becomes the Singer of All Songs, a long-prophesied being, and unites the Tree People and Voiced Ones in the Dance of Healing to give magic and health back to Tremaris. It is implied at the ending of the book that Calwyn is pregnant with Darrow's child.  Calwyn is also the lost twin sister of Halasaa.

Darrow a 28-year-old ironcrafter, raised on the seas. He was abducted as a child and raised in the Black Palace of Hathara, the enclave of the sorcerers in Merithuros, but left when his friend Samis sought to conquer Tremaris. He now seeks Samis, to end his reign of terror before it can become total. He contracts the snow-sickness and steadily loses his powers, but is saved in the end. His great desire, second to that of thwarting Samis, is to be with Calwyn.

Samis a minor prince of the Merithuran Empire who sought to be Emperor of all Tremaris by becoming the Singer of All Songs. He manipulates Calwyn into regaining her chantment and then kidnaps her. He teaches her the chantments he has learned and how to read an ancient language which can preserve the chantments. He and Calwyn have a minor romance during this time, something that Calwyn had come to regret. Overall, Samis appears to have grown wiser since his appearance in The Singer of All Songs. He no longer seeks to dominate all chanters and chantment, but rather to facilitate them and bring peace to Tremaris. Later, Calwyn sends Spareth, the spaceship that brought the ancestors of the Voiced Ones to Tremaris, back to its port of origin (presumably Earth), with Samis on board.

Tonno a fisherman from Kalysons and captain of the boat Fledgewing. Tonno has many times aided in Calwyn's quest, though he himself is not a chanter and relies on his massive build and strength. It is implied he has a crush on the deceitful ex-princess Keela, to preserve whose safety he is often shown acting throughout the novel.

Trout a 17-year-old former student of the weapon-building colleges of Mithates. Trout now uses his intellect to build practical items, including a navigational compass and a wheeled chair. His wits replace his lack of chantment. Trout has little love of nature, but is very loyal. Around the end of the book it is stated that he is in love with Mica.

Mica a 16-17-year-old windworker from the isles of Firthana, sold to pirates to sing wind for the sails. She accompanies Calwyn, who rescued her from slavery. Mica suffers as a result of Calwyn's unpleasant moods. Mica eventually decides to remain in Antaris, as she is greatly liked amongst the priestesses. Mica is eventually killed by a spear during the fight between the rebel Tree People and the priestesses of Antaris. Calwyn, saddened by this loss, decides that she and Darrow will name their first daughter Mica in memoriam her friend.

Halasaa an 18-year-old Tree Person; one of a voiceless, telepathic, secluded race of humanoids. He was sent away from his homeland of Spiridrell as punishment for his decision to guide Calwyn, and has accompanied her since then to many places. He is keenly sensitive to natural environments, very compassionate, and strongly intuitive. Halasaa and Calwyn are capable of the Power of Becoming, by which a damaged system is healed. He avoids the snow-sickness and leads his friends to the caves where the Tree People stay in the winter. Halasaa and Calwyn there discover that they are fraternal twins. He leads Calwyn's party to the place called the Knot of Waters and helps Calwyn teach the singers to dance and the dancers to sing. In the end, he himself begins to sing.

Keela the Third (and most attractive) Princess of Merithuros. All her schemes have been for her beloved half-brother Samis, with whom she is implied to have an incestuous relationship. Keela is known to change her loyalties as they benefit or harm her, leaving others ignorant of whether she can be trusted. She and Calwyn become "sisters" when they fall into the Knot of Waters, immersion in which restores to Calwyn her chantments and changes Keela for the better. Thereafter she remains on Calwyn's side.

Tamen the Guardian of the Wall of Antaris. Tamen became High Priestess after Marna's supposed death. In an effort to please the goddess Taris, Tamen entombed the snow-sick in the ice Wall; but this failed to produce the desired effect. She later loses title as High Priestess. Her fate is unknown, though it seems she may have committed suicide by drinking the poison called bitterthorn. Tamen often appears cruel, possibly as a result of frustration.

Marna the former High Priestess; Calwyn's dear friend, who assumed a maternal role in Calwyn's life. When Marna contracted snow-sickness, Ursca hid her so that she would not be sealed into the Wall. Marna teaches Calwyn the dark chantments — chantments of destruction — before she dies. Against custom, Marna is buried in a normal graveyard rather than in the sacred valley.

Briaali a Tree Person who believes in the possibility of peace between the Tree People and Voiced Ones. She is one of several, among whom she is leader. Briaali helps Calwyn and company after Calwyn enters the Knot of Waters.

Lia once a revered priestess and milk healer; now crippled as a result of falling from the Wall of Antaris. She supports Calwyn and is later made the new High Priestess in place of Tamen. Halasaa heals her so that she is capable of walking again.

Sibril a young male Tree Person who despises the Voiced Ones and wishes to reclaim his people's ancestral land. He leads an attack on the Wall by making a large bonfire to burn it. After the battle, he is shunned by his fellow Tree People, though welcomed by Calwyn.

Calida is Calwyn's mother. In her youth, Calida left Antaris by means of the river that runs beneath the Wall. She then traveled to the Wildlands, where she married the Tree Person Halwi and gave birth to Halasaa and Calwyn. Since Calwyn could sing and Halasaa could not, Calida chose to return to Antaris with Calwyn, so that her daughter could have a "normal" life. Calida died in Antaris, shortly after her return.

Halwi is Halasaa and Calwyn's father. It is from his side of the lineage that the Power of Becoming is inherited. Halwi is known to have died before Calwyn's return to the Wildlands.

Ursca is the infirmarian at Antaris. A dumpy and fussy woman who holds opinions to extent beyond reasonable limit, but holds positive interests at heart.

Gilly a former friend of Calwyn's, known to be frivolous, foolish, and prone to flirt. In the third book, she is wiser than before.

Locations
Antaris: a community of priestesses enclosed by a high ice wall, built originally as a refuge from bloodshed and tumult. Its High Priestess is matriarch of the society. Until the arrival of Samis in search of Darrow, custom held that the Wall, which was controlled by ice chantments, be opened only to traders, and seldom so. A sacred "Blazetree" stands in a valley, where it holds a ceremonial function. The community is organized into a nearly self-sustaining monastic structure. It is built on land from which the Tree People were driven, and later becomes the first site of interracial harmony between Tree People and Voiced Ones.

The Wildlands: The forested domain of the Tree People. It is south of Antaris and easteast of the Veiled Lands. The only major city mentioned in the books is Spiridrell, Halasaa's home until his meeting of Calwyn. The coast of the Wildlands is marked as "Uncharted" on the map of Tremaris featured by the 2003 edition of The Waterless Sea.

Spareth: Originally a gigantic spacecraft that brought the ancestors of the Voiced Ones, who had by then already learned chantment, to the planet Tremaris. Thereafter the Voiced Ones became, as is stated in The Tenth Power, an integral part of the planet's ecosystems, as did the chantments they bore. The vehicle of their coming, Spareth, later became known as a strange city. It was here that Samis attempted to command all chantment, and here that he kept Calwyn during their time as teacher and student. Ultimately, Samis set out to commandeer Spareth and travel with it to its port of origin (presumably Earth). Calwyn refused to go with him, but used her chantments to send the machine to his destination. It, like many others of the Voiced Ones' inventions, is activated and controlled by chantment.

Doryus: This is, throughout most of the story, the center of all piracy in Tremaris. It is a small archipelago, located northnorth of the Small Isles; east of the continent including Antaris and Wildlands; westwest of the island including Baltimar, Cragonlands, and Rengan; northwest of Merithuros; south of Firthana; and southeast of the Lakelands. Doryus, along with other islands in the Great Sea of Tremaris, is the home of the chanters of wind after the powers and/or their workers were divided.

The Veiled Lands: A place of great magic, which is greatest of all in the Knot of Waters. A network of caves exists here, wherein are crystalline walls of many colors and patterns of color. It is suggested that the ruby of the Ring of Lyonssar—a treasure of Merithuros owned by the commander of the sorcerers there—was mined from one of these. A cold, pure river runs through the caves, culminating in the Knot of Waters.

The Knot of Waters: A place where three whirlpools coincide. Magnetism is confounded here. It is the most sacred place in Tremaris, being older than the songs of chantment and more powerful than Spareth. Here, Keela and Calwyn nearly drown. They lose the fire-calling trumpet called the Clarion of the Flame in the waters; Calwyn, however, embraces the waters to save Keela, and so is preserved herself. Her immersion in the Knot of Waters gives her the power of chantment, which she had sacrificed in The Waterless Sea to restore harmony to Merithuros.

Merithuros: Home of the chanters of iron. It is located east of the Wildlands; south of Firthana and Doryus; south of Baltimar; and southeast of the Small Isles. When a schism caused by war divided the chanters and their powers, seven clans of people fled to Merithuros, where they built an empire. The empire was later overthrown and a republic built at the insistence of Darrow. Until then, Merithuros remained a desert, scarred by human carelessness. Thereafter, Calwyn's sacrifice (see above) restored the land's health to a small extent.

Kalysons: The plains which became home to the chanters of the Power of Beasts after the war mentioned above. Located on the Bay of Sardi, northeast of the Wildlands (being part of the same continent) and east of Mithates.

Mithates: Home to the chanters of fire after the war. Located west of Kalysons and northeast of Antaris. It is known for the colleges where students are trained to make weapons. Trout was a student there before his joining with Calwyn and Darrow. Because of over-reliance on technology, Mithates as a nation had largely forgotten its magic by the time of The Singer of All Songs. Its people are frequently shown harming each other.

Gellan: The home of the chanters of seeming (illusion) after the war. Located north of the nations surrounding the Bay of Sardi; northwest of the Small Isles; west of Firthana; southwest of the Outer Isles; and south of the Frozen Sea.

2005 Australian novels
Australian fantasy novels